Greenbank is a small informal district in the city of Bristol, England nestling between Easton to the west, Eastville to the north-east, Clay Bottom and Rose Green to the east, and Whitehall to the south. The area is mainly one of 1890s terraced housing with some present millennium housing on the north eastern edge of the cemetery. Nearly all of the housing is in the north-east of Easton electoral ward, though the road Greenbank View and the cemetery are in Eastville electoral ward.

Bristol & Bath Railway Path
The Bristol & Bath Railway Path forms the north eastern boundary of Greenbank and provides a traffic free route not only the two miles into Bristol but also 13 miles to Bath along one of the most scenic non-traffic cycle routes in the country. The Path is seen as being a valuable public asset by the people of Greenbank and other adjoining areas, with a 2008 campaign to stop it being used as a bus route garnering much local support. The Path also provides a valuable green haven in the form of a linear park in what is a very densely populated part of Bristol.

Schools
The area is well served with primary schools with Whitehall and May Park both being contiguous to Greenbank proper. The City Academy Bristol is within a few hundred meters down the Railway Path towards Lawrence Hill and Bristol Metropolitan College is only a mile toward Fishponds.

Greenbank Cemetery
In the far eastern corner of the cemetery are the memorials to the civilian dead of the Bristol Blitz of 1941. The area is very moving with some graves containing the remains of three generations of Bristolians. Nearby lies a separate military cemetery with graves from British and Commonwealth servicemen as well as the graves of German Luftwaffe crew killed during the Bristol Blitz as well as Italian Mariners killed in action.

Buildings
There are a few distinctive buildings within the area: 
 The Elizabeth Shaw chocolate factory (famous for its 'Famous Names' and 'Chocolate Crisp' brands)
 Chapel in Greenbank Cemetery 
 Greenbank Masjid, occupying a church building formerly used by the Castle Green United Reformed Church. Informally known as the "Lego Church", it was designed by Sir Frank Wills and built in 1902.

Development of Greenbank Chocolate Factory

The factory ceased chocolate production in 2006 since when various attempts have been made to secure planning permission and develop the site. In 2013 the factory passed into the hands of the Generator Group. The local community has always been actively interested in any proposals, and began to object in force when they discovered that a plan had been submitted to Bristol City Council on Christmas Eve 2014.

Gallery

References

External links
St. Anne's Church, Greenbank
A Short History of the Greenbank Chocolate Factory, John Penny (archived 2016)
Chocbox2.0 - information compiled by local people about the Chocolate Factory and its future
Aerial Shot of Greenbank, c. 1930, Map Your Bristol

Areas of Bristol